Dombeyoideae is a widely distributed subfamily of the Malvaceae, as proposed by the APG. Most of the plants placed here were once assembled with more or less related genera in the paraphyletic Sterculiaceae; a lesser number were placed in the Tiliaceae which were also not monophyletic.

The Dombeyoideae were originally described by Carl Beilschmied in 1833. In the present delimitation, they contain roughly 20 genera with about 380 species, some 60% of which are in Dombeya (one of the most speciose genera of Malvaceae). They grow in the Old World tropics, especially Madagascar and the Mascarenes where about two-thirds of the species occur. In the Mascarenes, they are among the most diverse angiosperm groups, analogous to such (unrelated) plants as the aeoniums on the Canary Islands or the silversword alliance of the Hawaiian Islands.

The subfamily is sometimes further divided into tribes (Corchoropsideae, Dombeyeae, Eriolaeneae, Helmiopsideae), but this is more often considered unwarranted. Probably, most or all of these supposed subdivisions are not monophyletic and thus technically synonyms of the whole subfamily.

Several species are noted for their beautiful timber which is used for inlays and other artwork. Others – namely from the type genus Dombeya – are popular ornamental plants due to their beautiful flowers. Trochetia is famous for the peculiar coloured nectar it can produce, and it often is pollinated by Phelsuma geckos.

Selected genera
Genera of Dombeyoideae include:
 Astiria Lindl. – probably belongs in Dombeya
 Burretiodendron – formerly in Tiliaceae
 Cheirolaena Benth
 Corchoropsis Siebold & Zucc. – formerly in Tiliaceae
 Dombeya 
 Eriolaena 
 Harmsia K.Schum.
 Helmiopsiella Arenes
 Helmiopsis H.Perrier
 Melhania 
 Nesogordonia 
 Paradombeya Stapf
 Paramelhania Arenes
 Pentapetes L.
 Pterospermum 
 Ruizia Cav.
 Schoutenia  – formerly in Tiliaceae
 Sicrea  f. – formerly in Tiliaceae
 Trochetia 
 Trochetiopsis

Footnotes

References

  (2006): Does minimizing homoplasy really maximize homology? MaHo: A method for evaluating homology among most parsimonious trees. C. R. Palevol 7(1): 17–26.  (HTML abstract)
  (2007a): Synonymy of Malvaceae. Retrieved 2008-JUN-25.
  (2007b): Malvaceae Info: Index to Genera. Retrieved 2008-JUN-25.

 
Rosid subfamilies